Bernd Scholz-Reiter (born 29 May 1957) is a German business engineer  and since 1 September 2012 the rector of the University of Bremen.

From 2007 until 2012 he was vice president of the Deutsche Forschungsgemeinschaft. He is a member of the Berlin-Brandenburgische Akademie der Wissenschaften.

Trivia 

Prof Scholz-Reiter took part in the Ice Bucket Challenge in 2014.

References 

{{ex[and German|Bernd Scholz-Reiter}}

Engineers from Bremen (state)
Living people
1957 births
Academic staff of the University of Bremen